Harald Seegard was a Norwegian luger who competed during the 1930s. He won the silver medal in the men's singles event at the 1937 European luge championships in Oslo, Norway.

References
List of European luge champions 

Norwegian male lugers
Year of birth missing
Year of death missing